The Washington metropolitan area, also sometimes referred to as the National Capital Region, is the metropolitan area centered on Washington, D.C. The metropolitan area includes all of Washington, D.C. and parts of Maryland, Virginia, and West Virginia. It is part of the larger Washington–Baltimore combined statistical area.

The Washington metropolitan area is one of the most educated and affluent metropolitan areas in the U.S. The metro area anchors the southern end of the densely populated Northeast megalopolis with an estimated total population of 6,385,162 , making it the sixth-largest metropolitan area in the nation and the largest metropolitan area in the Census Bureau's South Atlantic division.

Nomenclature
The U.S. Office of Management and Budget defines the area as the Washington–Arlington–Alexandria, DC–VA–MD–WV metropolitan statistical area, a metropolitan statistical area used for statistical purposes by the United States Census Bureau and other agencies. The region's three largest cities are the federal city of Washington, D.C., the county (and census-designated place) of Arlington, and the independent city of Alexandria. The Office of Management and Budget also includes the metropolitan statistical area as part of the larger Baltimore–Washington metropolitan area, which has a population of 9,546,579 as of the 2014 Census Estimate.

The Washington, D.C., Maryland, and Virginia portions of the metropolitan area is sometimes referred to as the National Capital Region, particularly by federal agencies such as the military, Department of Homeland Security, and some local government agencies. The National Capital Region portion of the Washington metropolitan area is also colloquially known by the abbreviation "DMV", which stands for the "District of Columbia, Maryland, Virginia." The region is surrounded by Interstate 495 with the locations inside of it referred to as Inside the Beltway. Washington, D.C., which is at the center of the area, is sometimes referred to as the District because of its status as a federal district, which makes it not part of any state. The Virginian portion of the region is known as Northern Virginia. The Maryland portion of the region is sometimes called the Maryland-National Capital Region by local authorities but rarely by the general public.

Composition

The U.S. Census Bureau divides the Washington metropolitan statistical area into two metropolitan divisions:
 Washington–Arlington–Alexandria, DC–VA–MD–WV Metropolitan Division, comprising the majority of the metropolitan area
 Frederick–Gaithersburg–Rockville, MD Metropolitan Division, consisting of Montgomery and Frederick counties

Counties or county equivalents and populations

Summary by state

Regional organizations

Metropolitan Washington Council of Governments
Founded in 1957, the Metropolitan Washington Council of Governments (MWCOG) is a regional organization of 21 Washington-area local governments, as well as area members of the Maryland and Virginia state legislatures, the U.S. Senate, and the U.S. House of Representatives. MWCOG provides a forum for discussion and the development of regional responses to issues regarding the environment, transportation, public safety, homeland security, affordable housing, community planning, and economic development.

The National Capital Region Transportation Planning Board, a component of MWCOG, is the federally designated metropolitan planning organization for the metropolitan Washington area.

Consortium of Universities in the Washington Metropolitan Area
Chartered in 1964, the Consortium of Universities of the Washington Metropolitan Area is a regional organization of 17 Washington-area local universities and community colleges representing nearly 300,000 students. The consortium facilitates course cross registration between all member universities, and universalizes library access across some of its member universities through the Washington Research Library Consortium. It additionally offers joint procurement programs, joint academic initiatives, and campus public safety training. These colleges and universities are:

Washington Metropolitan Area Transit Authority
Formed in 1967 as an interstate compact between Maryland, Virginia, and the District of Columbia, the WMATA is a tri-jurisdictional government agency with a board composed of representatives from Maryland, Virginia, the District of Columbia, and the United States Federal government that operates transit services in the Washington Metropolitan Area.

Metropolitan Washington Airports Authority
The Metropolitan Washington Airports Authority (MWAA) is a multi-jurisdictional independent airport authority, created with the consent of the United States Congress and the legislature of Virginia to oversee management, operations, and capital development of Ronald Reagan Washington National Airport and Washington Dulles International Airport.

Greater Washington Board of Trade
Founded in 1889, the Greater Washington Board of Trade is a network of regional businesses that work to advance the culture, economy, and resiliency of the Washington metropolitan area.

Cultural Alliance of Greater Washington

The Cultural Alliance of Greater Washington (CAGW) works to increase appreciation, support, and resources for arts and culture in the Washington metropolitan area.

Principal cities

The metropolitan area includes the following principal cities (not all of which are incorporated as cities; one, Arlington, actually is a county, while Bethesda, Silver Spring, and Reston are unincorporated census-designated places.)

Washington, D.C.
Arlington, Virginia
Alexandria, Virginia
Frederick, Maryland
Gaithersburg, Maryland
Rockville, Maryland
Bethesda, Maryland
Silver Spring, Maryland
Reston, Virginia

Demographics

Politics

The Washington metropolitan area has consistently leaned Democratic, only voting Republican once in Richard Nixon's landslide reelection in 1972. Since Bill Clinton was elected in 1992, Democratic candidates have easily won the area by double-digits.

Racial composition
The area has been a magnet for international immigration since the late 1960s. It is also a magnet for internal migration (persons moving from one region of the U.S. to another).

Racial composition of the Washington metropolitan area.

2019 American Community Survey
 Non-Hispanic White : 44.7%
 Black or African American : 24.9%
 Hispanic or Latino : 16.3%
 Asian : 10.3%
 Mixed and Other : 3.8%

{|
|-
! Hispanic Origin !! Asian Origin
|-
|5.2% Salvadoran ||2.9% Indian
|-
|2.3% Mexican ||1.9% Chinese
|-
|1.6% Guatemalan ||1.2% Korean
|-
|1.2% Puerto Rican ||1.2% Vietnamese
|-
|0.9% Honduran ||1.0% Filipino
|-
|0.9% Peruvian ||0.5% Pakistani
|-
|0.8% Bolivian ||0.2% Japanese
|-
|0.5% Colombian ||0.2% Thai
|-
|0.5% Dominican ||0.2% Bangladeshi
|-
|5.6% Other ||1.0% Other
|}

2010 U.S. Census

 White : 54.8%
 Black : 25.8%
 Asian : 9.3%
 Hispanic : 13.8%
 Mixed and Other : 3.7%

2006

 White : 51.7%
 Black : 26.3%
 Asian : 8.4%
 Hispanic : 11.6%
 Mixed and Other : 2.0%

1980
 White : 67.8%
 Black : 26.0%
 Asian : 2.5%
 Hispanic : 2.8%
 Mixed and Other : 0.9%

Social indicators

The Washington metropolitan area has ranked as the highest-educated metropolitan area in the nation for four decades. As of the 2006–2008 American Community Survey, the three most educated places with 200,000 people or more in Washington–Arlington–Alexandria by bachelor's degree attainment (population 25 and over) are Arlington, Virginia (68.0%), Fairfax County, Virginia (58.8%), and Montgomery County, Maryland (56.4%). Forbes magazine stated in its 2008 "America's Best- And Worst-Educated Cities" report: "The D.C. area is less than half the size of L.A., but both cities have around 100,000 Ph.D.'s."

The Washington metropolitan area has held the top spot in the American College of Sports Medicine's annual American Fitness Index ranking of the United States' 50 most populous metropolitan areas for two years running. The report cites, among other things, the high average fitness level and healthy eating habits of residents, the widespread availability of health care and facilities such as swimming pools, tennis courts, and parks, low rates of obesity and tobacco use relative to the national average, and the high median household income as contributors to the city's community health.

In the 21st century, the Washington metropolitan area has overtaken the San Francisco Bay Area as the highest-income metropolitan area in the nation. The median household income of the region is US$72,800. The two highest median household income counties in the nation – Loudoun and Fairfax County, Virginia – are components of the MSA (and #3 is Howard County, officially in Baltimore's sphere but strongly connected with Washington's); measured in this way, Alexandria ranks 10th among municipalities in the region – 11th if Howard is included – and 23rd in the entire United States. 12.2% of Northern Virginia's 881,136 households, 8.5% of suburban Maryland's 799,300 households, and 8.2% of Washington's 249,805 households have an annual income in excess of $200,000, compared to 3.7% nationally.

According to a report by the American Human Development Project, women in the Washington metropolitan area are ranked as having the highest income and educational attainment among the 25 most populous metropolitan areas in the nation, while Asian American women in the region had the highest life expectancy, at 92.3 years.

Economy

The Washington metropolitan area has the largest science and engineering work force of any metropolitan area in the nation in 2006 according to the Greater Washington Initiative at 324,530, ahead of the combined San Francisco Bay Area work force of 214,500, and Chicago metropolitan area at 203,090, citing data from U.S. Census Bureau, the Bureau of Labor Statistics, Claritas Inc., and other sources.

The Washington metropolitan area was ranked as the second best High-Tech Center in a statistical analysis of the top 100 Metropolitan areas in the United States by American City Business Journals in May 2009, behind the Silicon Valley and ahead of the Boston metropolitan area. Fueling the metropolitan area's ranking was the reported 241,264 tech jobs in the region, a total eclipsed only by New York, Los Angeles, and the San Francisco Bay Area, as well as the highest master's or doctoral degree attainment among the 100 ranked metropolitan areas. A Dice.com report showed that the Washington–Baltimore area had the second-highest number of tech jobs listed: 8,289, after the New York metro area with 9,195 jobs. In 2020, the total gross domestic product for the Washington-Arlington-Alexandria, DC-VA-MD-WV (MSA) was $561,027,941,000.

Real estate and housing market
Changes in house prices for the Washington metropolitan area are publicly tracked on a regular basis using the Case–Shiller index; the statistic is published by Standard & Poor's and is also a component of S&P's 10-city composite index of the value of the U.S. residential real estate market.

McLean ZIP code 22102 had the highest median home prices among ZIP codes within the Washington metropolitan area as of 2013.

Net worth, wealth disparities, and business ownership

The economy of the Washington metropolitan region is characterized by significant wealth disparities, which were heightened by the Great Recession and the 2007–09 housing crisis, which adversely affected black and Hispanic households more than other households.

A 2016 Urban Institute report found that the median net worth (i.e., assets minus debt) for white households in the D.C. region was $284,000, while the median net worth for Hispanic/Latino households was $13,000, and for African American households as $3,500. Asian Americans had the highest median net worth in the Washington area ($220,000 for Chinese American households, $430,000 for Vietnamese American households, $496,000 for Korean American households, and $573,000 for Indian American households).

Although the median net worth for white D.C.-area households was 81 times that of black D.C.-area households, the two groups had comparable rates of business ownership (about 9%). The Urban Institute report suggests that this "may be driven by the presence of a large federal government and a local district government whose membership and constituents have been largely Black, coupled with government policies designed to increase contracting opportunities for minority-owned businesses."

Primary industries

Biotechnology
The Washington metropolitan area has a significant biotechnology industry; companies with a major presence in the region as of 2011 include Merck, Pfizer, Human Genome Sciences, Martek Biosciences, and Qiagen. Additionally, many biotechnology companies such as United Therapeutics, Novavax, Emergent BioSolutions, Parabon NanoLabs and MedImmune have headquarters in the region. The area is also home to branch offices of many contract research organizations. Firms with a presence in the area include Covance, IQVIA, Charles River Laboratories, and ICON plc. The area's medical research is driven by government and non-profit health institutions, such as the Howard Hughes Medical Institute, J. Craig Venter Institute, and the National Institutes of Health.

Consumer goods
Local consumer goods companies include Nestle USA and Mars, Incorporated.

Defense contracting

Many defense contractors are based in the region to be close to the Pentagon in Arlington. Local defense contractors include Lockheed Martin, the largest, as well as General Dynamics, BAE Systems Inc., Northrop Grumman, Computer Sciences Corporation (CSC), Science Applications International Corporation (SAIC), CACI, ManTech International, DynCorp, and Leidos.

Hospitality
The Washington metropolitan area contains the headquarters of numerous companies in the hospitality and hotel industries. Major companies with headquarters in the region include Marriott International, The Ritz-Carlton Hotel Company, Hilton Worldwide, Park Hotels and Resorts, Choice Hotels, Host Hotels and Resorts, and HMSHost.

Mass media

The media industry is a significant portion of metropolitan Washington's economy. According to the Bureau of Labor Statistics, the Washington DC region has the second largest concentration of journalists and media personnel in the United States after the New York metropolitan area. Washington's industry presence includes major publications with national audiences such as The Washington Post, U.S. News & World Report, and USA Today, as well as new media publishers such as Vox Media, RealClearPolitics, Axios, and Politico. A secondary portion of this market is made up of periodicals such as National Affairs, those by The Slate Group, Foreign Policy, National Geographic, The American Prospect, and those by Atlantic Media, including The Atlantic. There are also many smaller regional publications present, such as The Washington Diplomat, The Hill, Hill Rag, Roll Call, Washington City Paper and the Washington Examiner.

Telecommunications
Anchored by the Dulles Technology Corridor, the telecommunications and tech industry in DC spans a diverse range of players across internet infrastructure, broadcasting, satellite communications, and datacenters. Firms headquartered in the area include Cogent Communications, GTT Communications, Hughes Network Systems, iCore Networks, Iridium Communications, Intelsat, Ligado Networks, NII Holdings, Oceus Networks, OneWeb, Tegna Inc., Transaction Network Services, Verisign, WorldCell, and XO Communications.

Tourism

Tourism is a significant industry in the Washington metropolitan region. In 2015, more than 74,000 tourism-sector jobs existed in the District of Columbia, a record-setting 19.3 million domestic tourists visited the city, and domestic and international tourists combined spent $7.1 billion. The convention industry is also significant; in 2016, D.C. hosted fifteen "city-wide conventions" with an estimated total economic impact of $277.9 million.

Tourism is also significant outside the District of Columbia; in 2015, a record-setting $3.06 billion in tourism spending was reported in Arlington, Virginia, and $2.9 billion in Fairfax County, Virginia. A 2016 National Park Service report estimated that there were 56 million visitors to national parks in the National Capital Region, sustaining 16,917 and generating close to $1.6 billion in economy impact.

Largest companies

History

The 2005 Base Realignment and Closure resulted in a significant shuffling of military, civilian, and defense contractor employees in the Washington metropolitan area. The largest individual site impacts of the time are as follows:
Fort Belvoir gained 11,858 employees, primarily as a result of the relocation of the National Geospatial-Intelligence Agency (NGA) into a massive new headquarters within the fort.
Fort Meade gained 5,361 employees, primarily as a result of the expansion of the National Security Agency.
Walter Reed Army Medical Center lost 5,630 employees as part of its realignment. It was later closed and consolidated into Walter Reed National Military Medical Center.
BRAC 2005 was the largest infrastructure expansion by the Army Corps of Engineers since World War II, resulting in the Mark Center, tallest building they have ever constructed, as well as National Geospatial-Intelligence Agency Campus East, which at 2.4 million square feet is the largest building the Corps have constructed since the Pentagon.

Transportation

'WMATA'-indicated systems are run by Washington Metropolitan Area Transit Authority and always accept Washington Metro fare cards, others may or may not.

Commercial service airports
Washington Dulles International Airport (IAD), located in Dulles, Virginia 
Ronald Reagan Washington National Airport (DCA), located in Arlington County, Virginia – the closest to Washington
Baltimore–Washington International Thurgood Marshall Airport (BWI), located in Linthicum, Maryland (outside of but serving the Washington metropolitan area)
Hagerstown Regional Airport (HGR), located in Washington County, Maryland – serves western Maryland, the Eastern Panhandle of West Virginia, and portions of south-central Pennsylvania and north-western Virginia along the Interstate 81 corridor

Rail transit systems
Washington Metro – DC, MD, VA (rapid transit) (WMATA)
MARC Train – DC, MD, WV (commuter rail)
Virginia Railway Express – DC, VA (commuter rail)
Amtrak – US (commuter rail, inter-city rail)

Bus transit systems
DC Circulator – Washington, D.C. (DDoT, WMATA)
Metrobus – Washington metropolitan area (WMATA)
Metroway – Arlington County, Virginia and Alexandria, Virginia (bus rapid transit) (WMATA)
Ride On – Montgomery County, Maryland
TheBus – Prince George's County, Maryland
ART – Arlington County, Virginia
DASH – Alexandria, Virginia
Fairfax Connector – Fairfax County, Virginia
CUE Bus – Fairfax, Virginia
Loudoun County Transit – Loudoun County, Virginia
PRTC – Prince William County, Manassas and Manassas Park
TransIT – Frederick County, Maryland
VanGO – Charles County, Maryland
Regional Transportation Agency of Central Maryland – Howard County, Anne Arundel County, Prince George's County, Laurel, Maryland
Maryland Transit Administration – Washington, D.C., Montgomery County, Maryland, Prince George's County, Frederick County, Maryland, Charles County, Maryland, Calvert County, Maryland, Howard County, Anne Arundel County, Saint Mary's County, Maryland
Eastern Panhandle Transit Authority – Jefferson County, West Virginia, Berkeley County, West Virginia
Virginia Regional Transit – Loudoun County, Virginia, Culpeper County, Virginia, Fauquier County, Virginia, Warren County, Virginia
Fredericksburg Regional Transit – Fredericksburg, Spotsylvania County and Stafford County

Major roads

Interstates

 – the Capital Beltway
 – signed as US 50

U.S. Highways

Bicycle sharing
Capital Bikeshare – Washington, D.C., Arlington, Virginia, Alexandria, Virginia, Fairfax County, Virginia, Prince George's County, Maryland, and Montgomery County, Maryland

Culture

Sports teams

Listing of the professional sports teams in the Washington metropolitan area:

Media

The Washington metropolitan area is home to 
DCTV, USA Today, C-SPAN, PBS, NPR, Politico, BET, TV One and Discovery Communications. The two main newspapers are The Washington Post and The Washington Times. Local television channels include WRC-TV 4 (NBC), WTTG 5 (FOX), WJLA 7 (ABC), WUSA 9 (CBS), WDCA 20 (MyNetworkTV), WETA-TV 26 (PBS), WDCW 50 (CW), and WPXW 66 (Ion). WJLA 24/7 News is a local news provider available only to cable subscribers. Radio stations serving the area include: WETA-FM, WIHT, WSBN, and WTOP.

Area codes

 202 & 771 (Starting November 2021) – Washington, D.C.
 571/703 – Northern Virginia including the cities of Alexandria, Fairfax, and Falls Church as well as Arlington, Fairfax, Stafford, Prince William, and Loudoun counties (571 created March 1, 2000; 703 in October 1947).
 240/301 – portions of Maryland in the Washington metropolitan area, southern Maryland, and western Maryland
 540 – Fredericksburg/Spotsylvania/Warrenton
 304/681 – Jefferson County, West Virginia

See also

 List of people from the Washington, D.C. metropolitan area
 List of U.S. metropolitan statistical areas in Virginia
 Potomac primary
 Northeast megalopolis

References

External links

OMB Bulletin No. 05-02
Urban Areas of Virginia
May 2006 Metropolitan and Nonmetropolitan Area Occupational Employment and Wage Estimates; Washington–Arlington–Alexandria, DC–VA–MD–WV Metropolitan Division
May 2005 Metropolitan Area Occupational Employment and Wage Estimates; Washington–Arlington–Alexandria, DC–VA–MD–WV Metropolitan Division
Washington–Arlington–Alexandria, DC–VA–MD–WV MSA Population and Components of Change

Capital districts and territories
 
Baltimore–Washington metropolitan area
Metropolitan areas of Maryland
Metropolitan areas of Virginia
Metropolitan areas of West Virginia
Regions of Maryland
Regions of Virginia
Regions of West Virginia
Washington, D.C.